Nadia Belakhdar (born 16 April 1991) is an Algerian team handball player. She plays for the club Noisy Le Grand, and on the Algerian national team. She competed at the 2013 World Women's Handball Championship in Serbia, where Algeria placed 22nd.

References

1991 births
Living people
Algerian female handball players
21st-century Algerian people